Jiang Ying may refer to:
Jiang Ying (musician) (1919–2012), Chinese opera singer and music educator
Jiang Ying (volleyball) (born 1963), Chinese volleyball player